WMBW (88.9 FM, Moody Radio Southeast) is a non-commercial educational radio station licensed to Chattanooga, Tennessee serving the Chattanooga metropolitan area. Owned by the Moody Bible Institute since 1973, the station broadcasts a religious format and is the Chattanooga affiliate for Moody Radio.

WMBW extends its signal by using a repeater, WMKW (89.3 FM), in Crossville, Tennessee.

Local programming includes Moody in the Morning and The Journey Home, week-day drive-time programs.

Repeater

References

External links

Moody Radio
MBW
Radio stations established in 1973
1973 establishments in Tennessee